The Jugoslovenske Železnice (JŽ; Yugoslavian Railways) class 62 was a class formed of 106 ex-United States Army Transportation Corps S100 Class  steam locomotives, surplus after the Second World War, plus about 90 similar examples built by Đuro Đaković of Slavonski Brod, Croatia between 1952 and 1961.

These Yugoslav-built examples differ in minor details, but principally the use of plate frames instead of bar frames, resulting in a higher boiler pitch.  This in turn leads to distinct shoulder on the steam pipes (the American-built examples having straight steam pipes) and smaller domes which have a flat top so they are not higher than the cab roof.

Preservation
Several of these engines survive, but one 62-669, built in 1960 was bought by a preservation group in England and has been modified to resemble a Southern Railway USA class, and become "No. 30075", one higher than the last British Railways example.  Another one has since followed:

  62-669 (built 1960) Shillingstone Railway Project "30075"  
  62-521 (built 1954) Shillingstone Railway Project "30076"

External links 

 Project 62, the project to restore and maintain the British-bought locomotive

USATC S100
Steam locomotives of Yugoslavia
0-6-0T locomotives
Davenport locomotives
H. K. Porter locomotives
Vulcan Iron Works locomotives
Standard gauge locomotives of Yugoslavia

Shunting locomotives